Il Novellino, also known as Le cento novelle antiche ("One Hundred Ancient Tales"), is an anonymous medieval collection of short stories written in the Tuscan vernacular between 1280 and 1300.

The author of the collection is unknown; several details from the stories included in the collection suggest that he was a layperson from Florence and likely belonged to the Ghibelline faction.

References

Italian literature
Medieval literature
Medieval Italian literature
Italian novels